Giuseppe Porelli (24 November  1897 – 5 March 1982) was an Italian stage, film and television actor.

Life and career 
Born Giuseppe Porcelli in Naples, he graduated from the Istituto Tecnico and became an employee of Ferrovie dello Stato. While there, he spent his free time involved in amateur dramatics. In 1918 he left his job to accept employment as a professional actor in the company of Irma Gramatica. Porelli later entered some of the most important stage companies of the time, specializing as a sidekick in revue shows.  Active on films since 1926, he had an intense career as a character actor, mostly cast in roles of elegant and fashionable gentlemen in comedy films. He was married to the actress Rinalda Marchetti.

Selected filmography 

 Just Married (1934)
 Unripe Fruit (1934)
 Thirty Seconds of Love (1936)
 Felicita Colombo (1937)
 Naples of Olden Times (1938)
The House of Shame (1938)
 Naples Will Never Die (1939)
 Heartbeat (1939)
 Two Million for a Smile (1939)
 The Sinner (1940)
 First Love (1941)
 Harlem (1943)
 I'll Sing No More (1945)
 The Ten Commandments (1945)
 Peddlin' in Society (1946)
 I Met You in Naples (1946)
 Unknown Man of San Marino (1946)
 Crime News (1947)
 Lost in the Dark (1947)
 È arrivato il cavaliere! (1950)
 Women and Brigands (1950)
 O.K. Nerone (1951)
 Paris Is Always Paris (1951) 
 Oggi sposi (1952) 
 Melody of Love (1952) 
 I, Hamlet (1952)
 It Was She Who Wanted It! (1953)
 The Enchanting Enemy (1953)
 Mid-Century Loves (1954)
 Poverty and Nobility (1954) 
 Naples Is Always Naples (1954)
 The Two Orphans (1954)
 Donatella (1956)
 The Wanderers (1956)
 Holiday Island (1957)
 I prepotenti (1958)
 Tunis Top Secret (1959)
 Tough Guys (1960)
 Don Camillo: Monsignor (1961)
 Mi vedrai tornare (1969)

References

External links 
 

1897 births
1982 deaths
Italian male film actors
Italian male television actors
Italian male stage actors
Male actors from Naples
20th-century Italian male actors